Dennis Flydtkjær (born 13 March 1978 in Videbæk) is a Danish politician, who is a member of the Folketing for the Danish People's Party. He was elected into parliament at the 2011 Danish general election.

Political career
Flydtkjær was a member of the municipal council of Herning Municipality from 2014 to 2017.

Flydtkjær has been a candidate for the Danish People's Party since 2004. He was a substitute member for the party in the Ringkøbing constituency in the 2005—2007 term and again in the 2007—2011 term. He was called upon to substitute for Christian H. Hansen on two separate occasions: from 23 May 2006 to 2 June 2006 and from 20 November 2008 to 31 January 2010. In the 2011 election he was elected into parliament, receiving 3,980 votes. He was reelected in 2015 with 9,097	votes and in 2019 with 4,622 votes.

External links 
 Biography on the website of the Danish Parliament (Folketinget)

References 

Living people
1978 births
People from Ringkøbing-Skjern Municipality
Danish People's Party politicians
Danish municipal councillors
Members of the Folketing 2011–2015
Members of the Folketing 2015–2019
Members of the Folketing 2019–2022
Denmark Democrats politicians
Members of the Folketing 2022–2026